Nanophotonics is a peer-reviewed open access scientific journal published by De Gruyter and Science Wise Publishing. It covers recent international research results, specific developments, and novel applications in the field of nanotechnology. Nanophotonics focuses on the interaction of photons with nano-structures, such as carbon nanotubes, nano metal particles, nanocrystals, semiconductor nanodots, photonic crystals, tissue, and DNA. The editor-in-chief is Stefan Maier (LMU München, Germany).

History
In 2010 Nanophotonics was initiated by founding editor Federico Capasso and publishing editor Dennis Couwenberg. The first issue was published in 2012.

Abstracting and indexing
The journal is abstracted and indexed in:

According to the Journal Citation Reports, the journal has a 2020 impact factor of 8.449.

References

External links

Materials science journals
English-language journals
De Gruyter academic journals
Nanotechnology journals
Creative Commons Attribution-licensed journals
Open access journals
Journals published between 13 and 25 times per year
Publications established in 2012
Optics journals